= Jami Shah =

Jami J. Shah
- Education: Ohio State University
- Known for: CAD/FEA, Structural Design, Design Theory, Design Informatics, GD&T/Precision Engineering
- Awards: Siemens Outstanding CAD Award (2009); Lifetime Achievement Award, ASME (2010); Performance Excellence Award, Boeing (2011)
- Scientific career
- Fields: Mechanical Engineering
- Workplaces: Arizona State University; Ohio State University

Jami J. Shah is an American mechanical engineer and professor of Mechanical and Aerospace Engineering at Ohio State University. After 30 years on the faculty at Arizona State and Director of Design Automation Lab, Jami J. Shah returned to his alma mater in 2015, the Ohio State University, as Honda Chair in Engineering Design. He received his Ph.D. in Mechanical Eng. from Ohio State at 1984. In his new position, he is establishing a new research lab in Digital Design & Manufacturing and a graduate program in Product Design Engineering. Prior to his academic career he worked in industry for 6 years, designing mechanical equipment and chemical machinery. His research areas include: CAD/FEA, Structural design, Design theory, design education, DfM/DfA, Design Informatics, CMM metrology and GD&T/Precision Engineering.

He is the co-author of 2 US patents, 2 books, and 250+ peer reviewed technical papers in professional journals and conferences. He is the founding chief editor of ASME Transaction, the Journal of Computing & Information Science in Engineering (JCISE) of which he was Chief Editor from 2001–2010. He is currently Area Editor of Research in Engineering Design and Co-Chief Editor of Journal of Computational Design & Engineering. In 2009, he received the Siemens Outstanding CAD Award; in 2010, the Lifetime Achievement Award from the American Society of Mechanical Engineers; and in 2011, the Performance Excellence Award from Boeing.
